The UEFA European Futsal Championship is the main futsal competition of the men's national futsal teams governed by UEFA (the Union of European Football Associations).

History
The first tournament was held in Spain in 1996 and featured only six teams. The tournament was expanded to eight teams in 1999 and held every two years, and further to 12 teams in 2010.

After 2018, the tournament was expanded to 16 teams and held every four years, to avoid leap years when the FIFA Futsal World Cup is being played. The first 16-team tournament was held in 2022 in the Netherlands.

Results by edition

Debut of teams

Performance by nations

* = hosts

Comprehensive team results by tournament
Legend
1st – Champions
2nd – Runners-up
3rd – Third place
4th – Fourth place
 – Semi-finalists
5th–8th – Fifth to Eighth place
9th–12th – Ninth to Twelfth place
Q – Qualified for upcoming tournament
 — Qualified but withdrew
 — Did not qualify
 — Did not enter
 – Withdrew from the European Championship / Banned / Entry not accepted by FIFA
 — Country not affiliated to UEFA at that time
 — Country did not exist or national team was inactive
 — Hosts

Summary (1996-2022)

Medals (1996-2022)

FIFA Futsal World Cup Qualifiers
Legend
1st – Champions
2nd – Runners-up
3rd – Third place
4th – Fourth place
QF – Quarterfinals
R2 – Round 2 (1989–2008, second group stage, top 8; 2012–present: knockout round of 16)
R1 – Round 1
     – Hosts

Q – Qualified for upcoming tournament

See also
 UEFA Women's Futsal Championship 
 UEFA Futsal Under-21 Championship (defunct)
 UEFA Under-19 Futsal Championship

References

External links

 
International futsal competitions
Futsal
Futsal competitions in Europe
European championships
Recurring sporting events established in 1996
1996 establishments in Europe